Thomas Nagel (born July 4, 1937) is an American philosopher. He is the University Professor of Philosophy and Law Emeritus at New York University, where he taught from 1980 to 2016. His main areas of philosophical interest are legal philosophy, political philosophy, and ethics.

Nagel is known for his critique of material reductionist accounts of the mind, particularly in his essay "What Is It Like to Be a Bat?" (1974), and for his contributions to liberal moral and political theory in The Possibility of Altruism (1970) and subsequent writings. He continued the critique of reductionism in Mind and Cosmos (2012), in which he argues against the neo-Darwinian view of the emergence of consciousness.

Life and career

Nagel was born on July 4, 1937, in Belgrade, Yugoslavia (now Serbia), to German Jewish refugees Carolyn (Baer) and Walter Nagel. He arrived in the US in 1939, and was raised in and around New York. He had no religious upbringing, but regards himself as a Jew.

Nagel received a Bachelor of Arts degree in philosophy from Cornell University in 1958, where he was a member of the Telluride House and was introduced to the philosophy of Ludwig Wittgenstein. He then attended the University of Oxford on a Fulbright Scholarship and received a Bachelor of Philosophy degree in 1960; there, he studied with J. L. Austin and Paul Grice. He received his Doctor of Philosophy degree in philosophy from Harvard University in 1963. At Harvard, Nagel studied under John Rawls, whom Nagel later called "the most important political philosopher of the twentieth century."

Nagel taught at the University of California, Berkeley, (from 1963 to 1966) and at Princeton University (from 1966 to 1980), where he trained many well-known philosophers, including Susan Wolf, Shelly Kagan, and Samuel Scheffler, the last of whom is now his colleague at New York University.

Nagel is a fellow of the American Academy of Arts and Sciences and a corresponding fellow of the British Academy, and, in 2006, was elected as a member of the American Philosophical Society. He has held a fellowship from the Guggenheim Foundation, the National Science Foundation, and the National Endowment for the Humanities. In 2008, he was awarded a Rolf Schock Prize for his work in philosophy, the Balzan prize, and the honorary degree of Doctor of Letters from the University of Oxford.

Philosophical work

Overview
Nagel began to publish philosophy at age 22; his career now spans over 60 years of publication. He thinks that each person, owing to their capacity to reason, instinctively seeks a unified world view, but if this aspiration leads one to believe that there is only one way to understand our intellectual commitments, whether about the external world, knowledge, or what our practical and moral reasons ought to be, one errs. For contingent, limited and finite creatures, no such unified world view is possible, because ways of understanding are not always better when they are more objective.

Like the British philosopher Bernard Williams, Nagel believes that the rise of modern science has permanently changed how people think of the world and our place in it. A modern scientific understanding is one way of thinking about the world and our place in it that is more objective than the commonsense view it replaces. It is more objective because it is less dependent on our peculiarities as the kinds of thinkers that people are. Our modern scientific understanding involves the mathematicized understanding of the world represented by modern physics. Understanding this bleached-out view of the world draws on our capacities as purely rational thinkers and fails to account for the specific nature of our perceptual sensibility. Nagel repeatedly returns to the distinction between "primary" and "secondary" qualities—that is, between primary qualities of objects like mass and shape, which are mathematically and structurally describable independent of our sensory apparatuses, and secondary qualities like taste and color, which depend on our sensory apparatuses.

Despite what may seem like skepticism about the objective claims of science, Nagel does not dispute that science describes the world that exists independently of us. His contention, rather, is that a given way of understanding a subject matter should not be regarded as better simply for being more objective. He argues that scientific understanding's attempt at an objective viewpoint—a "view from nowhere"—necessarily leaves out something essential when applied to the mind, which inherently has a subjective point of view. As such, objective science is fundamentally unable to help people fully understand themselves. In "What Is It Like to Be a Bat?" and elsewhere, he writes that science cannot describe what it is like to be a thinker who conceives of the world from a particular subjective perspective.

Nagel argues that some phenomena are not best grasped from a more objective perspective. The standpoint of the thinker does not present itself to the thinker: they are that standpoint. One learns and uses mental concepts by being directly acquainted with one's own mind, whereas any attempt to think more objectively about mentality would abstract away from this fact. It would, of its nature, leave out what it is to be a thinker, and that, Nagel believes, would be a falsely objectifying view. Being a thinker is to have a subjective perspective on the world; if one abstracts away from this perspective one leaves out what he sought to explain.

Nagel thinks that philosophers, over-impressed by the paradigm of the kind of objective understanding represented by modern science, tend to produce theories of the mind that are falsely objectifying in precisely this kind of way. They are right to be impressed—modern science really is objective—but wrong to take modern science to be the only paradigm of objectivity. The kind of understanding that science represents does not apply to everything people would like to understand.

As a philosophical rationalist, Nagel believes that a proper understanding of the place of mental properties in nature will involve a revolution in our understanding of both the physical and the mental, and that this is a reasonable prospect that people can anticipate in the near future. A plausible science of the mind will give an account of the stuff that underpins mental and physical properties in such a way that people will simply be able to see that it necessitates both of these aspects. Now, it seems to people that the mental and the physical are irreducibly distinct, but that is not a metaphysical insight, or an acknowledgment of an irreducible explanatory gap, but simply where people are at their present stage of understanding.

Nagel's rationalism and tendency to present human nature as composite, structured around our capacity to reason, explains why he thinks that therapeutic or deflationary accounts of philosophy are complacent and that radical skepticism is, strictly speaking, irrefutable. The therapeutic or deflationary philosopher, influenced by Wittgenstein's later philosophy, reconciles people to the dependence of our worldview on our "form of life". Nagel accuses Wittgenstein and American philosopher of mind and language Donald Davidson of philosophical idealism. Both ask people to take up an interpretative perspective to making sense of other speakers in the context of a shared, objective world. This, for Nagel, elevates contingent conditions of our makeup into criteria for what is real. The result "cuts the world down to size" and makes what there is dependent on what there can be interpreted to be. Nagel claims this is no better than more orthodox forms of idealism in which reality is claimed to be made up of mental items or constitutively dependent on a form supplied by the mind.

Philosophy of mind

What is it like to be a something

Nagel is probably most widely known in philosophy of mind as an advocate of the idea that consciousness and subjective experience cannot, at least with the contemporary understanding of physicalism, be satisfactorily explained with the concepts of physics. This position was primarily discussed by Nagel in one of his most famous articles: "What Is It Like to Be a Bat?" (1974). The article's title question, though often attributed to Nagel, was originally asked by Timothy Sprigge. The article was originally published in 1974 in The Philosophical Review, and has been reprinted several times, including in The Mind's I (edited by Daniel Dennett and Douglas Hofstadter), Readings in the Philosophy of Psychology (edited by Ned Block), Nagel's Mortal Questions (1979), The Nature of Mind (edited by David M. Rosenthal), and Philosophy of Mind: Classical and Contemporary Readings (edited by David J. Chalmers).

In "What Is It Like to Be a Bat?", Nagel argues that consciousness has essential to it a subjective character, a what it is like aspect. He writes, "an organism has conscious mental states if and only if there is something that it is like to be that organism—something it is like for the organism." His critics have objected to what they see as a misguided attempt to argue from a fact about how one represents the world (trivially, one can only do so from one's point of view) to a false claim about the world, that it somehow has first-personal perspectives built into it. On that understanding, Nagel is a conventional dualist about the physical and the mental. This is, however, a misunderstanding: Nagel's point is that there is a constraint on what it is to possess the concept of a mental state, namely, that one be directly acquainted with it. Concepts of mental states are only made available to a thinker who can be acquainted with their own states; clearly, the possession and use of physical concepts has no corresponding constraint.

Part of the puzzlement here is because of the limitations of imagination: influenced by his Princeton colleague Saul Kripke, Nagel believes that any type identity statement that identifies a physical state type with a mental state type would be, if true, necessarily true. But Kripke argues that one can easily imagine a situation where, for example, one's C-fibres are stimulated but one is not in pain and so refute any such psychophysical identity from the armchair. (A parallel argument does not hold for genuine theoretical identities.) This argument that there will always be an explanatory gap between an identification of a state in mental and physical terms is compounded, Nagel argues, by the fact that imagination operates in two distinct ways. When asked to imagine sensorily, one imagines C-fibres being stimulated; if asked to imagine sympathetically, one puts oneself in a conscious state resembling pain. These two ways of imagining the two terms of the identity statement are so different that there will always seem to be an explanatory gap, whether or not this is the case. (Some philosophers of mind have taken these arguments as helpful for physicalism on the grounds that it exposes a limitation that makes the existence of an explanatory gap seem compelling, while others have argued that this makes the case for physicalism even more impossible as it cannot be defended even in principle.)

Nagel is not a physicalist because he does not believe that an internal understanding of mental concepts shows them to have the kind of hidden essence that underpins a scientific identity in, say, chemistry. But his skepticism is about current physics: he envisages in his most recent work that people may be close to a scientific breakthrough in identifying an underlying essence that is neither physical (as people currently think of the physical), nor functional, nor mental, but such that it necessitates all three of these ways in which the mind "appears" to us. The difference between the kind of explanation he rejects and the kind he accepts depends on his understanding of transparency: from his earliest work to his most recent Nagel has always insisted that a prior context is required to make identity statements plausible, intelligible and transparent.

Natural selection and consciousness

In his 2012 book Mind and Cosmos, Nagel argues against a materialist view of the emergence of life and consciousness, writing that the standard neo-Darwinian view flies in the face of common sense. He writes that mind is a basic aspect of nature, and that any philosophy of nature that cannot account for it is fundamentally misguided. He argues that the principles that account for the emergence of life may be teleological, rather than materialist or mechanistic. Despite Nagel's being an atheist and not a proponent of intelligent design (ID), his book was "praised by creationists", according to the New York Times. Nagel writes in Mind and Cosmos that he disagrees with both ID defenders and their opponents, who argue that the only naturalistic alternative to ID is the current reductionist neo-Darwinian model.

Nagel has argued that ID should not be rejected as non-scientific, for instance writing in 2008 that "ID is very different from creation science," and that the debate about ID "is clearly a scientific disagreement, not a disagreement between science and something else." In 2009, he recommended Signature in the Cell by the philosopher and ID proponent Stephen C. Meyer in The Times Literary Supplement as one of his "Best Books of the Year." Nagel does not accept Meyer's conclusions but endorsed Meyer's approach, and argued in Mind and Cosmos that Meyer and other ID proponents, David Berlinski and Michael Behe, "do not deserve the scorn with which they are commonly met."

Ethics

Nagel's Rawlsian approach
Nagel has been highly influential in the related fields of moral and political philosophy. Supervised by John Rawls, he has been a longstanding proponent of a Kantian and rationalist approach to moral philosophy. His distinctive ideas were first presented in the short monograph The Possibility of Altruism, published in 1970. That book seeks by reflection on the nature of practical reasoning to uncover the formal principles that underlie reason in practice and the related general beliefs about the self that are necessary for those principles to be truly applicable to us. Nagel defends motivated desire theory about the motivation of moral action. According to motivated desire theory, when a person is motivated to moral action it is indeed true that such actions are motivated, like all intentional actions, by a belief and a desire. But it is important to get the justificatory relations right: when a person accepts a moral judgment they are necessarily motivated to act. But it is the reason that does the justificatory work of justifying both the action and the desire. Nagel contrasts this view with a rival view which believes that a moral agent can only accept that they have a reason to act if the desire to carry out the action has an independent justification. An account based on presupposing sympathy would be of this kind.

The most striking claim of the book is that there is a very close parallel between prudential reasoning in one's own interests and moral reasons to act to further the interests of another person. When one reasons prudentially, for example about the future reasons that one will have, one allows the reason in the future to justify one's current action without reference to the strength of one's current desires. If a hurricane were to destroy someone's car next year, at that point they will want their insurance company to pay them to replace it: that future reason gives them a reason to take out insurance now. The strength of the reason ought not to be hostage to the strength of one's current desires. The denial of this view of prudence, Nagel argues, means that one does not really believe that one is one and the same person through time. One is dissolving oneself into distinct person-stages.

Altruistic action
This is the basis of his analogy between prudential actions and moral actions: in cases of altruistic action for another person's good that person's reasons quite literally become reasons for one if they are timeless and intrinsic reasons. Genuine reasons are reasons for anyone. Like the 19th-century moral philosopher Henry Sidgwick, Nagel believes that one must conceive of one's good as an impersonal good and one's reasons as objective reasons. That means, practically, that a timeless and intrinsic value generates reasons for anyone. A person who denies the truth of this claim is committed, as in the case of a similar mistake about prudence, to a false view of themself. In this case the false view is that one's reasons are irreducibly theirs, in a way that does not allow them to be reasons for anyone: Nagel argues this commits such a person to the view that they cannot make the same judgments about their own reasons third-personally that they can make first-personally. Nagel calls this "dissociation" and considers it a practical analogue of solipsism (the philosophical idea that only one's own mind is sure to exist). Once again, a false view of what is involved in reasoning properly is refuted by showing that it leads to a false view of people's nature.

Subjective and objective reasons
Nagel's later work on ethics ceases to place as much weight on the distinction between a person's personal or "subjective" reasons and their "objective" reasons. Earlier, in The Possibility of Altruism, he took the stance that if one's reasons really are about intrinsic and timeless values then, qua subjective reason, one can only take them to be the guise of the reasons that there really are: the objective ones. In later discussions, Nagel treats his former view as an incomplete attempt to convey the fact that there are distinct classes of reasons and values, and speaks instead of "agent-relative" and "agent-neutral" reasons. In the case of agent-relative reasons (the successor to subjective reasons), specifying the content of the reason makes essential reference back to the agent for whom it is a reason. An example of this might be: "Anyone has a reason to honor his or her parents." By contrast, in the case of agent-neutral reasons (the successor to objective reasons) specifying the content of the reason does not make any essential reference back to the person for whom it is a reason. An example of this might be: "Anyone has a reason to promote the good of parenthood."

Objective reasons
The different classes of reasons and values (i.e., agent-relative and agent-neutral) emphasized in Nagel's later work are situated within a Sidgwickian model in which one's moral commitments are thought of objectively, such that one's personal reasons and values are simply incomplete parts of an impersonal whole. The structure of Nagel's later ethical view is that all reasons must be brought into relation to this objective view of oneself. Reasons and values that withstand detached critical scrutiny are objective, but more subjective reasons and values can nevertheless be objectively tolerated. However, the most striking part of the earlier argument and of Sidgwick's view is preserved: agent-neutral reasons are literally reasons for anyone, so all objectifiable reasons become individually possessed no matter whose they are. Thinking reflectively about ethics from this standpoint, one must take every other agent's standpoint on value as seriously as one's own, since one's own perspective is just a subjective take on an inter-subjective whole; one's personal set of reasons is thus swamped by the objective reasons of all others.

World agent views
This is similar to "world agent" consequentialist views in which one takes up the standpoint of a collective subject whose reasons are those of everyone. But Nagel remains an individualist who believes in the separateness of persons, so his task is to explain why this objective viewpoint does not swallow up the individual standpoint of each of us. He provides an extended rationale for the importance to people of their personal point of view. The result is a hybrid ethical theory of the kind defended by Nagel's Princeton PhD student Samuel Scheffler in The Rejection of Consequentialism. The objective standpoint and its demands have to be balanced with the subjective personal point of view of each person and its demands. One can always be maximally objective, but one does not have to be. One can legitimately "cap" the demands placed on oneself by the objective reasons of others. In addition, in his later work, Nagel finds a rationale for so-called deontic constraints in a way Scheffler could not. Following Warren Quinn and Frances Kamm, Nagel grounds them on the inviolability of persons.

Political philosophy
The extent to which one can lead a good life as an individual while respecting the demands of others leads inevitably to political philosophy. In the Locke lectures published as the book Equality and Partiality, Nagel exposes John Rawls's theory of justice to detailed scrutiny. Once again, Nagel places such weight on the objective point of view and its requirements that he finds Rawls's view of liberal equality not demanding enough. Rawls's aim to redress, not remove, the inequalities that arise from class and talent seems to Nagel to lead to a view that does not sufficiently respect the needs of others. He recommends a gradual move to much more demanding conceptions of equality, motivated by the special nature of political responsibility. Normally, people draw a distinction between what people do and what people fail to bring about, but this thesis, true of individuals, does not apply to the state, which is a collective agent. A Rawlsian state permits intolerable inequalities and people need to develop a more ambitious view of equality to do justice to the demands of the objective recognition of the reasons of others. For Nagel, honoring the objective point of view demands nothing less.

Atheism
In Mind and Cosmos, Nagel writes that he is an atheist: "I lack the sensus divinitatis that enablesindeed compelsso many people to see in the world the expression of divine purpose as naturally as they see in a smiling face the expression of human feeling." In The Last Word, he wrote, "I want atheism to be true and am made uneasy by the fact that some of the most intelligent and well-informed people I know are religious believers. It isn't just that I don't believe in God and, naturally, hope that I'm right in my belief. It’s that I hope there is no God! I don’t want there to be a God; I don’t want the universe to be like that."

Experience itself as a good
Nagel has said, "There are elements which, if added to one's experience, make life better; there are other elements which if added to one's experience, make life worse. But what remains when these are set aside is not merely neutral: it is emphatically positive. ... The additional positive weight is supplied by experience itself, rather than by any of its consequences."

Personal life
Nagel married Doris Blum in 1954, divorcing in 1973. In 1979, he married Anne Hollander, who died in 2014.

Awards
Nagel received the 1996 PEN/Diamonstein-Spielvogel Award for the Art of the Essay for Other Minds (1995). He has also been awarded the Balzan Prize in Moral Philosophy (2008), the Rolf Schock Prize in Logic and Philosophy of the Royal Swedish Academy of Sciences (2008) and the  Distinguished Achievement Award of the Mellon Foundation (2006).

Selected publications

Books
  (Reprinted in 1978, Princeton University Press.)
 
 
 
 
 
 
 
 
 
 
 Nagel, Thomas (2012).  Mind and Cosmos: why the materialist neo-Darwinian conception of nature is almost certainly false. Oxford New York: Oxford University Press,

Articles
 1959, "Hobbes's Concept of Obligation", Philosophical Review, pp. 68–83.
 1959, "Dreaming", Analysis, pp. 112–6.
 1965, "Physicalism", Philosophical Review, pp. 339–56.
 1969, "Sexual Perversion", Journal of Philosophy, pp. 5–17 (repr. in Mortal Questions).
 1969, "The Boundaries of Inner Space", Journal of Philosophy, pp. 452–8.
 1970, "Death", Nous, pp. 73–80 (repr. in Mortal Questions).
 1970, "Armstrong on the Mind", Philosophical Review, pp. 394–403 (a discussion review of A Materialist Theory of the Mind by D. M. Armstrong).
 1971, "Brain Bisection and the Unity of Consciousness", Synthese, pp. 396–413 (repr. in Mortal Questions).
 1971, "The Absurd", Journal of Philosophy, pp. 716–27 (repr. in Mortal Questions).
 1972, "War and Massacre", Philosophy & Public Affairs, vol. 1, pp. 123–44 (repr. in Mortal Questions).
 1973, "Rawls on Justice", Philosophical Review, pp. 220–34 (a discussion review of A Theory of Justice by John Rawls).
 1973, "Equal Treatment and Compensatory Discrimination", Philosophy & Public Affairs, vol. 2, pp. 348–62.
 1974, "What Is it Like to Be a Bat?", Philosophical Review, pp. 435–50 (repr. in Mortal Questions). Online text
 1976, "Moral Luck", Proceedings of the Aristotelian Society Supplementary vol. 50, pp. 137–55 (repr. in Mortal Questions).
 1979, "The Meaning of Equality", Washington University Law Quarterly, pp. 25–31.
 1981, "Tactical Nuclear Weapons and the Ethics of Conflict", Parameters: Journal of the U.S. Army War College, pp. 327–8.
 1983, "The Objective Self", in Carl Ginet and Sydney Shoemaker (eds.), Knowledge and Mind, Oxford University Press, pp. 211–232.
 1987, "Moral Conflict and Political Legitimacy", Philosophy & Public Affairs, pp. 215–240.
 1994, "Consciousness and Objective Reality", in R. Warner and T. Szubka (eds.), The Mind-Body Problem, Blackwell.
 1995, "Personal Rights and Public Space", Philosophy & Public Affairs, vol. 24, no. 2, pp. 83–107.
 1997, "Assisted Suicide: The Philosophers' Brief" (with R. Dworkin, R. Nozick, J. Rawls, T. Scanlon, and J. J. Thomson), New York Review of Books, March 27, 1997.
 1998, "Reductionism and Antireductionism", in The Limits of Reductionism in Biology, Novartis Symposium 213, John Wiley & Sons, pp. 3–10.
 1998, "Concealment and Exposure", Philosophy & Public Affairs, vol. 27, no. 1, pp. 3–30. Online text
 1998, "Conceiving the Impossible and the Mind-Body Problem", Philosophy, vol. 73, no. 285, pp. 337–352. Online PDF 
 2000, "The Psychophysical Nexus", in Paul Boghossian and Christopher Peacocke (eds.) New Essays on the A Priori, Oxford: Clarendon Press, pp. 432–471. Online PDF 
 2003, "Rawls and Liberalism", in Samuel Freeman (ed.) The Cambridge Companion to Rawls, Cambridge University Press, pp. 62–85.
 2003, "John Rawls and Affirmative Action", The Journal of Blacks in Higher Education, no. 39, pp. 82–4.
 2008, "Public Education and Intelligent Design", Philosophy and Public Affairs
 2009, "The I in Me", a review article of Selves: An Essay in Revisionary Metaphysics by Galen Strawson, Oxford, 448 pp, lrb.co.uk
 2021, Thomas Nagel, "Types of Intuition: Thomas Nagel on human rights and moral knowledge", London Review of Books, vol. 43, no. 11 (3 June 2021), pp. 3, 5–6, 8. Deontology, consequentialism, utilitarianism.

See also
 American philosophy
 List of American philosophers
 New York University Department of Philosophy
 David Chalmers
 Frank Jackson
 Galen Strawson
 Hard problem of consciousness
 Knowledge argument

References

Further reading
.

External links

 
 
 
 

1937 births
Living people
20th-century American philosophers
21st-century American philosophers
Jewish American atheists
Analytic philosophers
Atheist philosophers
American consciousness researchers and theorists
American people of German-Jewish descent
Cornell University alumni
Corresponding Fellows of the British Academy
Critics of postmodernism
Harvard University alumni
Jewish philosophers
Kantian philosophers
Members of the American Philosophical Society
Members of the European Academy of Sciences and Arts
New York University faculty
New York University School of Law faculty
Non-Darwinian evolution
PEN/Diamonstein-Spielvogel Award winners
People from Belgrade
Philosophers of mind
Princeton University faculty
Rolf Schock Prize laureates
Serbian atheists
Serbian Jews
Serbian people of German descent
Yugoslav emigrants to the United States